No. 619 Squadron RAF was a heavy bomber squadron of the Royal Air Force during the Second World War, flying Lancaster bombers from bases in Lincolnshire.

History

The squadron was formed out of elements of 97 Squadron at RAF Woodhall Spa in Lincolnshire on 18 April 1943, equipped with Lancaster Mk.III bombers, as part of 5 Group in Bomber Command. It also flew Lancaster Mk.I bombers. Their first mission was flown in the night of 11 June 1943, when 12 Lancasters were sent to bomb targets in Düsseldorf, and the last bombing mission was flown on 25 April 1945, when 6 Lancasters tried to bomb Obersalzberg. The last operational mission was flown a day later, when 2 Lancasters laid mines in the Oslo Fjord near Horten. After that mission the squadron ferried ex-prisoners of war back to the United Kingdom from Belgium (Operation Exodus).
The squadron operated out of various Lincolnshire stations, before being disbanded at RAF Skellingthorpe on 18 July 1945.

Members of the squadron were awarded 1 DSO, 76 DFCs and 37 DFMs. The squadron was mentioned 10 times in despatches.

Aircraft operated

Squadron bases

Notable people
 Charles Clarke: served as a bomb aimer, shot down in 1944, interned in Stalag Luft III, was a spotter and forger for the Great Escape, retired from RAF as an Air Commodore.
 Nick Knilans: American who served with the squadron from 1943 to 1944, later served with No. 617 Squadron RAF (the "Dambusters")

Commanding officers

See also
 List of Royal Air Force aircraft squadrons

References
Notes

Bibliography

External links

 No. 619 Squadron history
 No. 619 Squadron RAF movement and equipment history
 No. 619 Squadron bases
 Nos. 611 - 620 Squadron Histories

Bomber squadrons of the Royal Air Force in World War II
619 Squadron
Military units and formations established in 1943
Military units and formations disestablished in 1945